Uri Peso (born 8 January 1987 in Jerusalem) is an Israeli footballer who currently plays for Maccabi Yavne.

Honours
Israeli Third Division (1):
2010-11

References

1987 births
Living people
Israeli footballers
Hapoel Jerusalem F.C. players
Beitar Tel Aviv Bat Yam F.C. players
Ayia Napa FC players
Hapoel Petah Tikva F.C. players
Hapoel Katamon Jerusalem F.C. players
Hapoel Rishon LeZion F.C. players
Maccabi Yavne F.C. players
Footballers from Jerusalem
Israeli expatriate footballers
Expatriate footballers in Cyprus
Israeli expatriate sportspeople in Cyprus
Israeli people of Greek-Jewish descent
Liga Leumit players
Israeli Premier League players
Cypriot First Division players
Association football defenders